De Gradibus was an Arabic book published by the Arab physician Al-Kindi (c. 801–873 CE). De gradibus is the Latinized name of the book. An alternative name for the book was Quia Primos.

In De Gradibus, Al-Kindi attempts to apply mathematics to pharmacology by quantifying the strength of drugs.  According to Prioreschi, this was the first attempt at serious quantification in medicine.  He also developed a system, based on the phases of the Moon, that would allow a doctor to determine in advance the most critical days of a patient's illness.  During the Arabic-Latin translation movement of the 12th century, De Gradibus was translated into Latin by Gerard of Cremona.  Al-Kindi's mathematical reasoning was complex and hard to follow; Roger Bacon commented that his method of computing the strength of a drug was extremely difficult to use.

References

Medical works of the medieval Islamic world
Mathematical works of the medieval Islamic world
Scientific works of the Abbasid Caliphate
9th-century Arabic books